Silver Diner is an American restaurant chain with locations in the eastern United States (Maryland, Virginia, New Jersey, Washington D.C.). Its corporate headquarters are in Rockville, Maryland.

History
In 1989, Robert Giaimo and Ype Von Hengst opened the original Silver Diner in Rockville, Maryland. This original location has annual sales of $6 million. Silver Diner Development LLC. operates 19 restaurants in the mid-Atlantic region of the United States with locations in New Jersey, Maryland, Virginia, and Washington D.C. and employs more than 1,700 people.

In 2007, Silver Diner established its first airport location with the opening of its sixteenth restaurant in the AirMall at Baltimore/Washington International Thurgood Marshall Airport (BWI).

In 2015, Silver Diner introduced a new restaurant chain called Silver, an upscale casual restaurant and bar featuring craft cocktails. ^

In 2016, Goode Partners made a strategic growth investment in Silver Diner.

References

External links

Regional restaurant chains in the United States
Restaurants established in 1989
Diners in the United States
Companies based in Rockville, Maryland
American companies established in 1989
1989 establishments in Maryland